James Dowell (born 4 March 1993) is an English professional wrestler currently signed to WWE, where he performs on the NXT brand under the ring name Jagger Reid. He is a former NXT UK Tag Team Champion alongside Rip Fowler.

Professional wrestling career 
In January 2017, Drake participated in the WWE United Kingdom Championship Tournament to crown the inaugural WWE United Kingdom Champion, losing to Joseph Conners in the first round.

Progress Wrestling (2016–2019) 
In 2017, Drake and Zack Gibson formed a villainous tag team called Grizzled Young Veterans in Progress Wrestling. Grizzled Young Veterans defeated Chris Brookes and Kid Lykos of CCK to become the Progress tag team champions. They successfully defended the titles against Aussie Open (Kyle Fletcher and Mark Davis) at Progress Chapter 59. At Chapter 61, Grizzled Young Veterans defeated Moustache Mountain (Tyler Bate and Trent Seven) to retain their championships.

WWE

NXT UK (2017–2020) 
In January 2017, Drake participated in the WWE United Kingdom Championship Tournament to crown the inaugural WWE United Kingdom Champion, losing to Joseph Conners in the first round.
On 12 January 2019 Drake and Gibson defeated Moustache Mountain in a tournament final at NXT UK's debut TakeOver event in Blackpool, to become the inaugural NXT UK Tag Team Champions. Grizzled Young Veterans would defend their titles against, Oney Lorcan & Danny Burch, Amir Jordan & Kenny Willams, & Moustache Mountain before losing it to Mark Andrews & Flash Morgan Webster at NXT UK Takeover: Cardiff in a triple-threat tag team also involving Gallus. On the Sept 11 episode of NXT UK, Grizzled Young Veterans unsuccessfully challenged Andrews & Webster in a rematch. On the Nov 7 episode of NXT UK, during the Grizzled Young Veterans match against Andrews & Webster, Gallus and Imperium interfered. On the Nov 28 episode of NXT UK, Grizzled Young Veterans and Andrews & Webster interfered during Gallus' title match against Imperium and Grizzled Young Veterans took the titles and ran but the general managers came and announced that Gallus would defend their titles at NXT UK Takeover: Blackpool II against Grizzled Young Veterans, Andrews & Webster and Imperium for the titles in a ladder match. At the event, Grizzled Young Veterans lost the match. Grizzled Young Veterans also competed in the 2020 Dusty Rhodes Classic and they defeated Kushida & Alex Shelley in the quarterfinals and NXT Tag Team Champions the Undisputed Era in the semifinals due to a distraction by Imperium.

NXT (2020–present) 
On the 19 February 2020 episode of NXT, the Grizzled Young Veterans joined the NXT brand, defeating Raul Mendoza and Joaquin Wilde before announcing their intent to take over NXT's tag team division, establishing themselves as tweeners. At the Dusty Rhodes tag team classic The Grizzled Young Veterans got all the way to the finals before losing to MSK. At NXT Takeover Stand and Deliver The Grizzled Young Veterans we’re defeated by MSK for the vacant NXT tag team Championship also involving Fantasma. On an episode of NXT The Grizzled Young Veterans defeated L. A. Knight and Cameron Grimes. On the July 19, 2022 edition of NXT, him and Zack Gibson were revealed as Joe Gacy's Dyad, being renamed to Jagger Reid and Rip Fowler, respectively.

Championships and accomplishments

 Progress Wrestling
Progress Tag Team Championship (3 times) - with Zack Gibson
 Pro Wrestling Chaos
King Of Chaos Championship (1 time)
Pro Wrestling Illustrated
 Ranked No. 205 of the top 500 singles wrestlers in the PWI 500 in 2019
 WWE
NXT UK Tag Team Championship (1 time, inaugural) - with Zack Gibson

References

External links
 
 
 
 

1993 births
Living people
Sportspeople from Blackpool
English male professional wrestlers
21st-century professional wrestlers
NXT UK Tag Team Champions
PROGRESS Tag Team Champions